The William Mathers House, on Kentucky Route 36 in Nicholas County, Kentucky near Carlisle, was started in 1812.  It was listed on the National Register of Historic Places in 1989.

It includes elements of Greek Revival and Federal architecture.

It was started in 1812 by William Mathers as a two-room four-bay Federal-style brick building, with brick laid in Flemish bond.  The bricks were fired on site, using clay brought about 10 miles from Pleasant Valley.

Around 1858 a two-story Greek Revival section, also using Flemish bond masonry, was added by William Mathers' son Barton W. Mathers.  Around 1920 a Colonial Revival porch was added over the entrance to this section.

References

National Register of Historic Places in Nicholas County, Kentucky
Federal architecture in Kentucky
Greek Revival architecture in Kentucky
Houses completed in 1812
1812 establishments in Kentucky
Houses in Nicholas County, Kentucky
Houses on the National Register of Historic Places in Kentucky